The Proto-Tethys or Theic Ocean was an ancient ocean that existed from the latest Ediacaran to the Carboniferous (550–330 Ma).

History of concept
The name "Proto-Tethys" has been used inconsistently for several concepts for a supposed predecessor of the Paleo-Tethys Ocean, a palaeocean that separated the margins of Gondwana, often referred to as peri-Gondwana, from various continents and Gondwana-derived continental fragments from Precambrian times and onwards.
In this model the Proto-Tethys separated the North China and Baltica continents from Gondwana. In the Early Ordovician 500-480 Ma, the Proto-Tethys was subducted under Cadomia as a result of the Chamrousse back-arc basin. used the name 'Ran Ocean' for a similar concept, the Cambrian-Ordovician ocean that separated Baltica from Gondwana.

Other geologists dispute the existence of such an ocean.

Palaeozoic evolution
The ocean formed when Pannotia disintegrated, Proto-Laurasia (Laurentia, Baltica, and Siberia) rifted away from a supercontinent that would become Gondwana.  Proto-Tethys formed between these two supercontinents.  The ocean was bordered by Panthalassic Ocean to the north, separating it from Panthalassa by island arcs and Kazakhstania.  The Proto-Tethys expanded during the Cambrian.  The ocean was at its widest during the Late Ordovician to Middle Silurian.  The ocean was situated between the Siberia to the west, and Gondwana to the east.  The ocean began to shrink during the Late Silurian, when North China, and South China moved away from Gondwana and headed north.  In the late Devonian, the microcontinent of Kazakhstania collided with Siberia, shrinking the ocean even more.  The ocean closed when the North China craton collided with Siberia-Kazakstania continent in the Carboniferous, while the Paleo-Tethys Ocean expanded.

See also
 Paleo-Tethys Ocean
 Tethys Ocean
 Rheic Ocean

References

Notes

Sources

External links
 Proto-tethys ocean – at global history
 Paleo-Tethys and Proto-Tethys – at global history
 Early Carboniferous – at PaleoMap Project (North China microcontinent begins to collide with Siberia-Kazakstania continent closing the Proto-Tethys)

Historical oceans
Proterozoic
Cambrian paleogeography
Ordovician paleogeography
Silurian bodies of water
Devonian paleogeography
Carboniferous paleogeography